The Spitzer Infrared Nearby Galaxies Survey (SINGS) was a survey of 75 galaxies using the Spitzer Space Telescope, carried out between 2003 and 2006. 

One of the telescope's six Legacy Science Projects, SINGS collected a comprehensive set of spectroscopic data in the infrared region, which, in conjunction with measurements at other wavelengths, was intended to provide insights into star formation and other processes occurring within these galaxies.

References

External links 
 SINGS Legacy Website
 Spitzer website

Astronomical imaging
Infrared imaging
Spitzer Space Telescope